John Leeds Kerr (January 15, 1780February 21, 1844) was an American politician.

Early years

Kerr was born in 1780 at Greenbury Point near Annapolis, Maryland, and graduated from St. John's College of Annapolis in 1799.  He studied law, was admitted to the bar in 1801, and commenced practice in Easton, Maryland.

A Politician

Kerr was Deputy State's Attorney for Talbot County, Maryland from 1806 to 1810.  During the War of 1812, Kerr commanded a company of militia, and was later appointed agent of the State of Maryland in 1817 to prosecute claims against the federal government growing out of the War.  In 1824, Kerr was elected to the Nineteenth and Twentieth Congresses, and served from March 4, 1825 to March 3, 1829.  He was unsuccessful candidate for reelection in 1828, but was elected two years later in 1830 to the Twenty-second Congress, and served one term from March 4, 1831 to March 3, 1833.  In Congress, Kerr served as chairman of the Committee on Territories (Twenty-second Congress).  After Congress, he served as presidential elector on the Whig ticket in 1840

Kerr was elected to the United States Senate as a Whig to fill the vacancy caused by the death of John S. Spence and served from January 5, 1841, to March 3, 1843.  In the Senate, Kerr served as chairman of the Committee on Public Buildings (Twenty-seventh Congress), and as a member of the Committee on Patents and the Patent Office (Twenty-seventh Congress).  Kerr died in Easton in 1844, and is interred in the Bozman family cemetery at "Bellville", near Oxford Neck, Maryland.

Kerr's son, John Bozman Kerr, also served in Congress.

References

Belleville Cemetery

1780 births
1844 deaths
United States senators from Maryland
St. John's College (Annapolis/Santa Fe) alumni
American militiamen in the War of 1812
Politicians from Annapolis, Maryland
Maryland Whigs
Whig Party United States senators
National Republican Party members of the United States House of Representatives from Maryland
People from Easton, Maryland
19th-century American politicians